Robert Carpenter (July 28, 1909 – August 25, 1979) was a member of the Ohio House of Representatives.

References 

Members of the Ohio House of Representatives
1909 births
1979 deaths
20th-century American politicians